The 2010 Michigan Attorney General election took place on November 2, 2010, to elect the Attorney General of Michigan. Two-term incumbent Mike Cox was term-limited by the Michigan Constitution from seeking a third term. Republican Bill Schuette, a former Congressman, state Senator and judge of the Michigan Court of Appeals, defeated Genesee County Prosecutor David Leyton with 54 percent of the vote.

Republican Party

Candidates

Declared
 Mike Bishop, Majority Leader of the Michigan Senate
 Bill Schuette, former U.S. Representative, Judge of the Michigan Court of Appeals and state Senator,

Withdrew
 Bruce Patterson, state Senator

Patterson, a term-limited state Senator, was the first to form a campaign, forming an exploratory campaign in January, though he did not compete for the nomination at the Republican Party Convention in August 2010. After being expected to win the nomination handily, Schuette defeated Bishop by less than 100 votes to secure the nomination.

Democratic Party

Candidates

Declared
 David Leyton, Genesee County Prosecutor

Withdrew
 Richard Bernstein, Attorney
 Gretchen Whitmer, state Senator

Despite filing for the race, both Bernstein and Whitmer withdrew before the state Democratic Party Convention and Leyton won the nomination uncontested.

Minor parties

Libertarian Party
 Daniel W. Grow, attorney

U.S. Taxpayers Party
 Gerald Van Sickle, attorney, nominee for Attorney General of Michigan in 2002

General election

Results

References

External links
Official campaign websites
 Bill Schuette for Attorney General

See also

Attorney General
Michigan Attorney General elections
November 2010 events in the United States
Michigan